is a private university in Urayasu, Chiba, Japan, established in 2006. Its facilities include 126 classrooms, a library, four gymnasiums, and an administration area for staff and reception.

External links
  

Educational institutions established in 2006
Private universities and colleges in Japan
Universities and colleges in Chiba Prefecture
Urayasu, Chiba
2006 establishments in Japan